Boba Bola (born 2 October 1985) is a Rwandan former footballer.

Career 
Bola joined Landskrona BoIS 2005, coming from APR FC. He was close to be loaned out to the Swedish side IF Limhamn Bunkeflo but the affair didn't go off, instead he was loaned out to Bodens BK. He made 26 appearances and scored 3 goals for Landskrona BoIS, before he left on 22 December 2008. He was promoted after the 2008 season to the reserve team of Landskrona BoIS and was than on trial with Motala AIF. In summer 2009 and a half year for Landskrona BoIS II signed a contract for Syrianska IF Kerburan. After the releasing by Syrianska IF signed the typically striker in March 2010 for Panellinios IF. In August 2010 he signed a contract for Finnish Atlantis FC.

International career 
He represented Rwanda at full international level and is a key player for Amavubi.

References

External links
 

1985 births
Living people
Footballers from Kinshasa
Rwandan footballers
Rwandan expatriate footballers
Association football forwards
APR F.C. players
Landskrona BoIS players
Bodens BK players
Syrianska IF Kerburan players
Atlantis FC players
IFK Lidingö players
Rwanda international footballers
Allsvenskan players
Expatriate footballers in Sweden
Rwandan expatriate sportspeople in Sweden
Expatriate footballers in Finland
Rwandan expatriates in Finland
21st-century Democratic Republic of the Congo people